The Ordre des architectes du Québec is a professional association representing architects in the Canadian province of Quebec. As of 2010, it claims more than 2,700 members.

From 1951 awards the Médaille du Mérite to architects for their contribution to the development of the quality of architecture in Quebec.

External links
Ordre des architectes du Québec

References

Architecture associations based in Canada
Organizations based in Montreal

Professional associations based in Quebec